Casin may refer to:

Cașin, a commune and village in Bacău County, Romania
Casín cheese, a protected designation for cheese products from Spain that are produced exclusively from three cattle breeds
Casín beef, a protected designation for meat products from Spain that are produced exclusively from the Casina a.k.a. Asturian Mountain cattle breed
 CASIN (Cdc42 activity-specific inhibitor), also known as 2-((6-phenyl-2,3,4,9-tetrahydro-1H-carbazol-1-yl)amino)ethanol, otherwise known as Pirlindole-related compound 2 is Cdc42 activity‐specific inhibitor

See also
Casein